Agustín Muñoz Grandes (27 January 1896 – 11 July 1970) was a Spanish general, and politician, vice-president of the Spanish Government and minister with Francisco Franco several times; also known as the commander of the Blue Division between 1941 and 1942.

Biography 
Born in Carabanchel Bajo on 27 January 1896, Muñoz Grandes enrolled at the Toledo Infantry Academy while in his teens. Upon graduating, he was deployed to Morocco in 1915 and in 1925 took part in the decisive Battle of Alhucemas. Muñoz Grandes fought for the Nationalists during the Spanish Civil War and was promoted to General, taking command in the Army of Africa. He led the Spanish Legionnaries in the conquest of Málaga by the Nationalists in February 1937.

In 1941, Muñoz Grandes was given command of the División Azul, Generalísimo Franco's volunteer unit created for service under the Wehrmacht on the Eastern Front, against the Soviet Union. Muñoz Grandes was well acquainted with the Nazi German military establishment, and attended several interviews with Wilhelm Canaris and Adolf Hitler.

During his command Muñoz Grandes was decorated with the Knight's Cross of the Iron Cross, with Oak Leaves personally added by Hitler. He was recalled to Spain in December 1942. A promotion to Lieutenant General awaited him at home, and his post on the Eastern Front was taken up by Emilio Esteban Infantes.

Muñoz Grandes was appointed Captain General of I Military District in 1945, Minister of the Army in 1951 and Chief of the Defence High Command (chief of staff of the Spanish Armed Forces) in 1958. He served as Deputy Prime Minister of Spain from 1962 to 1967. In this capacity he advised Franco to enter the Vietnam War in order to gain better relations with the United States; however, Franco was reluctant to publicly support the war or the United States, and ultimately only several teams of medical personnel were sent, covertly.

Muñoz Grandes died in 1970.

Awards 
Order of Cisneros (1956, 1970)
Knight's Cross of the Iron Cross (12 March 1942)
 Oak Leaves (12 December 1942)
Iron Cross (1939)
 2nd Class (8 September 1941)
 1st Class (19 January 1942)

References

Bibliography

External links
 

1896 births
1970 deaths
People from Madrid
Spanish captain generals
Spanish generals
Spanish military personnel of the Spanish Civil War (National faction)
Spanish military personnel of World War II
Recipients of the Knight's Cross of the Iron Cross with Oak Leaves
Foreign recipients of the Legion of Merit
Deputy Prime Ministers of Spain
Spanish anti-communists
Defence ministers of Spain
FET y de las JONS politicians
Government ministers during the Francoist dictatorship